Chung Hyeon was the defending champion but chose not to participate. He played in Barcelona during this week.

Bjorn Fratangelo won the title, defeating Jared Donaldson 6–1, 6–3 in the final.

Seeds

Draw

Finals

Top half

Bottom half

References
Main Draw
Qualifying Draw

Savannah Challenger - Singles